Herteliana is a genus of lichenized fungi in the family Ramalinaceae.

The genus name of Herteliana is in honour of Hannes Hertel (b.1939), a German botanist (Mycology, Lichenology and Bryology), Taxonomist, Curator of Lichenes/Bryophytes and Director of the Botanische Staatssammlung München.

The genus was circumscribed by Peter Wilfrid James in Lichenologist vol.12 on pages 106, 110-111 in 1980.

Species accepted by GBIF include;
 Herteliana australis 
 Herteliana gagei 
 Herteliana schuyleriana

References

Ramalinaceae
Lichen genera
Lecanorales genera